The 2011–12 season in Hong Kong football, starting in July 2011 and ending in June 2012.

The season began on 3 September 2011 for the First Division League and the Second Division League, on 17 September 2011 for the Third A Division League and 25 September 2011 for the Third District Division League. The Third District Division League ended on 15 March 2012 and the Third A Division League ended on 25 March 2012. The top two teams of Third A Division League and the Third A Division League were qualified for the Third Division League Final Round. The Final Round started on 1 April 2012 and ended on 15 April 2012. The Second Division League ended on 15 April 2012 and the First Division League ended on 20 May 2012.

Honours

Trophy & League Champions

Representative team

Hong Kong

2014 FIFA World Cup qualification

Hong Kong had gone through their 2014 FIFA World Cup qualifying campaign, where they were knocked out in the Second Round by Saudi Arabia

Second round

Match Detail

Match Detail

Long Teng Cup

This is a tournament was organized by Chinese Taipei Football Association and take place in Kaohsiung, Taiwan from 30 September to 4 October 2011. Another three participating teams is Chinese Taipei, the Philippines and Macau. This year, Hong Kong sent their senior teams, as weel as another three associations did. FIFA ensured that these 3 matches are the formal international matches after the tournament.

The first match of Hong Kong team was against the Philippines on 30 September. Hong Kong was leading 2 goals before being scored 3 goals. Au Yeung Yiu Chung scored the equalizer before the end of the match. Hong Kong then won the following matches by winning Macau and Chinese Taipei 5–1 and 6–0 respectively. Hong Kong won the 2011 Long Teng Cup by getting 7 points in the competition.

2012 Guangdong–Hong Kong Cup

This is a tournament between two teams representing Hong Kong and Guangdong Province of China respectively.  This year, Hong Kong had chosen 3 non-Hong Kong born player who are or will soon be able to represent Hong Kong. They are Godfred Karikari, Jaimes McKee and Jack Sealy.

The first leg took place in Hong Kong, being held in Hong Kong Stadium. Guangdong scored the first goal, but Hong Kong scored 2 goals, both in headers. However, before the end of the match, Guangdong equalized the match. The second leg took place in Huizhou, Guangdong, being held in Huizhou Olympic Stadium. Both teams could not score any goals in 120 minutes. Both Yapp Hung Fai, goalkeeper of Hong Kong, and Yang Zhi (footballer), goalkeeper of Guangdong and the China PR's first goalkeeper choice, saved 2 penalties in the first 5 rounds. In the seventh round, Yapp Hung Fai saved Ge Zheen's penalty, while Man Pei Tak converted. Hong Kong won the champion again since 2009.

Match Detail

Match Detail

Friendly matches in second half season
This is the first match for the new head coach Ernie Merrick.

The Hong Kong Football Association organised two friendly match, both will be played in Hong Kong in June. Hong Kong played the first match against Singapore on 1 June 2012.

The second match against Vietnam will be played in Mong Kok Stadium on 10 June 2012.

Hong Kong U-22

2012 Hong Kong–Macau Interport

The 68th Hong Kong–Macau Interport was held at Macau National Stadium, Macau on 16 June 2012. Hong Kong was represented by its under-22 national team. The Hong Kong U-22 captured the champion by winning 3–1 this year.

2013 AFC U-22 Asian Cup qualification

Hong Kong U-22 will participate in 2013 AFC U-22 Asian Cup qualification from 23 June 2012 to 3 July 2012 in Laos. Hong Kong is in group F along with China PR, North Korea, Cambodia, Laos and Thailand. They will play in a one-round league format and the top two teams of each group will qualify for the tournament proper along with the best third-placed team in all the groups. All the matches of group F is held in Laos.

Hong Kong U-21

Friendly against Russia U-19
The match was to celebrate the official opening of the newly renovated Mong Kok Stadium.

Exhibition matches

2012 Asian Challenge Cup

2012 Asian Challenge Cup, also known as Nikon Asian Challenge Cup 2012, is the annual football event held in Hong Kong in Lunar New Year. South China are the host of the tournament. Seongnam Ilhwa Chunma from South Korea, Guangzhou Evergrande from China and Shimizu S-Pulse from Japan are invited to participate in this tournament. Each team will play a semi-final match in the first match day. Losers of semi-final matches will play in the third place match while winners will play in the final in the second match day. Seongnam Ilhwa Chunma are the champions after defeating Shimizu S-Pulse in the final.

References